Harold Pressley (born July 14, 1963) is an American former professional basketball player. He spent four years in the National Basketball Association (NBA) for the Sacramento Kings between 1986 and 1990 before playing a major role in Joventut Badalona's success both in the Spanish league and the Euroleague until 1993.

College 
After attending Saint Bernard High School in Uncasville, Connecticut, Pressley played collegiately at Villanova University and was a member of their 1985 National Championship team. At Villanova, he became the first player in Big East history to record a triple-double, with 19 points, 15 rebounds, and 10 blocked shots against Providence. He was named to the 1985 NCAA Southeast Regional All-Tournament Team, the 1986 All Big East First Team, a 1986 Associated Press honorable mention All American, the 1986 Big East All-Tournament Team and the 1986 Big East Defensive Player of the Year.

Professional career 
Pressley was selected by the Sacramento Kings in the 1st round (17th overall pick) of the 1986 NBA Draft. He played the shooting guard and small forward positions for four years with the Kings, averaging 9.0 points and 4.5 rebounds per game. Seeing less opportunities once the Kings hired coach Dick Motta, in 1990 Pressley signed a contract with Joventut Badalona of the Spanish ACB league, winning two consecutive championships in 1991 and 1992 and reaching the 1992 Euroleague final alongside Jordi Villacampa and Corny Thompson. He had 20 points and 9 rebounds against Partizan, but his performance was not enough to prevent a 70–71 loss, highlighted by Sasha Djordjevic' buzzer beater three pointer. In the 1993–94 season, Pressley signed with Pau Orthez in France, before returning to Spain and finishing his career.

Post athletic career 
Pressley was a co-host on Sierra Central Sports Roundtable, a sports show that airs every Sunday morning on Comcast Sports Net in the Sacramento area. On March 30, 2007, he began serving as Director of Player Development for the Sacramento Kings. His son Bryce Pressley was a college basketball player at the University of Portland.

References

External links 
 NBA stats at basketball-reference.com
 Fibaeurope.com profile

1963 births
Living people
American expatriate basketball people in France
American expatriate basketball people in Spain
American men's basketball players
Baloncesto León players
Basketball coaches from New York (state)
Basketball players from New York City
Élan Béarnais players
Joventut Badalona players
Liga ACB players
McDonald's High School All-Americans
Parade High School All-Americans (boys' basketball)
Sacramento Kings draft picks
Sacramento Kings players
Small forwards
Sportspeople from the Bronx
Villanova Wildcats men's basketball players